Frédéric Vitoux (born 30 October 1970) is a former professional tennis player from France. He is a member of the Union nationale des joueurs professionnels de tennis (UNJPT), and part of the "after-tennis" committee of the DTN (Direction technique nationale) of the Fédération Française De Tennis (FFT).

Vitoux made his Grand Slam debut in the 1990 French Open and was beaten in the opening round by Soviet player Andrei Cherkasov. He made two further French Open appearances and was eliminated in the first round again in each, to Michael Chang and Andrei Medvedev. The Frenchman qualified for the US Open in 1996 and registered his first ever Grand Slam win when he accounted for fellow qualifier Ramón Delgado in the opening round. He was then eliminated in the second round by David Wheaton in four sets.

It wasn't until 1994 that he appeared in an ATP Tour event that wasn't a Grand Slam. He made the second round of the 1996 Abierto Mexicano de Tenis tournament in Mexico City.

References

External links
 
 

1970 births
French male tennis players
Living people
Sportspeople from Versailles, Yvelines